Bastiaan Quast  is a Dutch-Swiss data scientist. He is the main author of the open-source rnn and attention deep-learning frameworks in the R programming language, and the datasets.load GUI package, as well as R packages on Global Value Chain decomposition & WIOD and on Regression Discontinuity Design. Quast is a great-great-grandson of the Nobel Peace Prize laureate Tobias Asser.

Early life and education 
Bastiaan Quast graduated from University of Groningen with a bachelor's degree in Economics and bachelor's degree in Theoretical philosophy. He holds a master's degree in Econometrics from the University of St. Gallen He obtained his Ph.D from Graduate Institute with advisors Richard Baldwin and Jean-Louis Arcand, his work on local languages and internet usage was discussed at the 2017 G20 meeting in Germany.

Career 

Bastiaan Quast created the popular machine learning framework rnn in R, which allows native implementations of recurrent neural network architectures, such as LSTM and GRU (>30,000 downloads). While working at UNCTAD, Quast developed the popular package datasets.load, which is part of the top 10% of most downloaded R packages (>50,000). The R packages decompr and wiod have been downloaded >20,000 times.

Bibliography 
Kummritz, Victor; Quast, Bastiaan (2017). Global value chains in developing economies. London, United Kingdom: VoxEU.

References

External links
 Bastiaan Quast

Year of birth missing (living people)
Living people
Dutch computer scientists
Data scientists
Computer programmers
Swiss computer scientists
University of Groningen alumni
University of St. Gallen alumni
Graduate Institute of International and Development Studies alumni
Dutch expatriates in Switzerland
R (programming language) people